Talon Chute is a waterfall on the Mattawa River and historic site on the border between the geographic township of Olrig, Nipissing, Unorganized, North Part and the municipality of Calvin in Nipissing District, northeastern Ontario, Canada. It features a water control dam and was once the site of a brucite marble mine.

See also
List of mines in Ontario

References

External links
Ministry of Natural Resources Information Center (http://nhic.mnr.gov.on.ca/areas/areas_report.cfm?areaid=18523)
Indian and Northern Affairs Canada - Copy of First Nations Treaty (http://www.ainc-inac.ca/pr/trts/trchip_e.html)
Canadian Heritage Rivers System - (https://web.archive.org/web/20080624083738/http://www.chrs.ca/Rivers/Mattawa/Mattawa-F_e.htm)

sources supporting location

Geography of Nipissing District
Mines in Northern Ontario